Playa de Oro International Airport is located in Manzanillo, Colima, Mexico. It is the biggest international airport in Colima, and an important gateway for tourism.

Information
It handled 86,200 passengers in 2019, and 133,300 passengers in 2021.

Airlines and destinations

Statistics

Passengers

Busiest routes

Facilities

Car rental service
There are four car rental booths just as you come out of customs and immigration: Alamo, Budget, Sixt, and Thrifty.  Cars are located onsite.
Veico Car Rental

See also 

 List of the busiest airports in Mexico

References

External links

 Manzanillo International Airport

Airports in Colima